Sofia Ester was born in 1978, in Lisbon. Her first book, Adozinda, was published in 1995. Sofia Ester finished writing this book in 1993. The book Adozinda is about the adventures of a sixteen-year-old sorceress who lives in Portugal, in the present time. Because, most of the time, her parents work abroad, Adozinda is alone at home. She has to cope with teenagers’ everyday problems, and try to solve them has best has she can.

Ester wrote two more books about Adozinda: 
 Adozinda e Zulmiro – A magia da adolescência
 Adozinda – A Faculdade de Ciências Ocultas

Ester also wrote the book Carta de Amor a Luís de Camões.

References 
António Garcia Barreto, Dicionário de Literatura Infantil Portuguesa, page 185, Campo das Letras, .

External links 
Sofia Ester's official site 
Web site about the books written by Sofia Ester
Interview with Sofia Ester
Article about Sofia Ester

1978 births
Living people
People from Lisbon
Portuguese women writers